San Benito National Forest was established by the U.S. Forest Service in California on October 26, 1907 with . On July 1, 1908 San Benito was added to Monterey National Forest and the name was discontinued.  Much of the land that once consisted of San Benito National Forest is now administered by the Bureau of Land Management Hollister Field office as the Clear Creek Management Area.

References

External links
Forest History Society
Listing of the National Forests of the United States and Their Dates (from the Forest History Society website) Text from Davis, Richard C., ed. Encyclopedia of American Forest and Conservation History. New York: Macmillan Publishing Company for the Forest History Society, 1983. Vol. II, pp. 743-788.

Los Padres National Forest
Former National Forests of California
Protected areas established in 1907
1907 establishments in California
1908 disestablishments in California
Protected areas disestablished in 1908